South Carolina Highway 254 (SC 254) is a  state highway in the U.S. state of South Carolina. The highway connects Greenwood and Cokesbury.

Route description
SC 254 begins at an intersection with SC 72 Business (SC 72 Bus.; Grace Street/Reynolds Avenue) just west of Lander University, in Greenwood, the county seat of Greenwood County. It travels to the north and immediately curves to the north-northwest. It has an intersection with U.S. Route 25 (US 25), US 178, and SC 72 and a crossing of Rocky Creek just before leaving the city limits. The highway passes by Greenwood High School and Pinecrest Elementary School. About  later, it crosses Turner Branch. Just before crossing Coronaca Creek, the highway begins to curve to the northwest. It passes Cokesbury Hills Golf Club just before entering Cokesbury at Parker Road. There, it intersects SC 246. At the intersection with Mt. Ariel Road and Ridge Road, it leaves Cokesbury. Approximately  later, it meets its northern terminus, an intersection with US 25.

Major intersections

See also

References

External links

SC 254 at Virginia Highways' South Carolina Highways Annex

254
Transportation in Greenwood County, South Carolina